Estádio da Cidadela is a stadium in Luanda, Angola. It is used mostly for football matches, while sometimes hosting cultural events, including musical concerts. It is part of the Complexo Desportivo da Cidadela, along with the Pavilhão da Cidadela, Pavilhão Anexo and Pavilhão Anexo II. While originally holding 40,000 people, in 2006, the stadium's upper ring has been declared unsafe by the CAF and banned for public use.

Until Angola's independence in November 1975, the stadium has been owned by Futebol Clube de Luanda, one of the most traditional and historical clubs in Luanda. Shortly after, it has been nationalised for the purpose of general government use.

The stadium is often referred to as the cathedral of Angolan sports as over the years, it has witnessed some of the most important events in Angolan sports. Among other events, it has hosted the 2nd Central African Games, for which it was re-inaugurated on December 10, 1981. The stadium is also considered to be special to the Angola national football team and especially for Angolan football hero Akwá. From 2010 however, it has been overshadowed by the newer, modern Estádio 11 de Novembro.

At present, the stadium is being used by Girabola clubs Progresso do Sambizanga and ASA as their home ground.

References

Buildings and structures in Luanda
Cidadela
Angola
Multi-purpose stadiums
Sport in Luanda